Straight Outta Burbank... is the second EP of The Burbank Duology by American rock band Stone Sour. The EP consists of another five cover songs from bands that influenced the members. The EP's title is a reference to the 1988 N.W.A. album Straight Outta Compton.

Marketing
The album's cover artwork was revealed on November 9, 2015, while the track list was also revealed on the same day on the Rolling Stone magazine. The whole EP was be released on Black Friday 2015 on Record Store Day, which was the same as last record.

Track listing

Personnel
Stone Sour
 Corey Taylor – vocals, gang vocals on "Running Free" and "Too Fast for Love", piano on "Gimme Shelter"
 Josh Rand – guitars, gang vocals on "Running Free" and "Too Fast for Love"
 Christian Martucci – guitars, gang vocals on "Running Free" and "Too Fast for Love"
 Johny Chow – bass guitar, gang vocals on "Running Free" and "Too Fast for Love"
 Roy Mayorga – drums, percussion, gang vocals on "Running Free" and "Too Fast for Love", engineering
Additional personnel
 Lzzy Hale – vocals on "Gimme Shelter"
 Jeremy White – harmonica on "Gimme Shelter"
 Jay Ruston – mixing, Corey Taylor's vocals recording
 Shawn Economaki – "Gimme Shelter" and "Seasons in the Abyss" solo engineering

Charts

References

Stone Sour albums
Roadrunner Records EPs
2015 EPs